Americus Institute was a secondary school that operated in Americus, Georgia, United States during the late 1800s and early 1900s. The school was established in 1897 by the Southwestern Georgia Baptist Association in order to educate African American youth in the area. By the 1920s, the school was enrolling about 200 students annually and was considered one of the premier secondary schools for African Americans in the state. The school closed in 1932.

Establishment and early years 

The idea for a secondary school in Americus, Georgia designed to educate the African American youth of the area began in 1878 amongst the members of the Southwestern Colored Baptist Association. Americus was located in Georgia's Black Belt, with about 1 million African Americans living within  of the city. Despite the large population, the area lacked adequate educational facilities for African Americans. However, by the 1890s, the money raised for the school had been mishandled and the size of the campus had shrunk significantly. Additionally, the initial enthusiasm for the school had subsided within the group. Despite this, the school, known as Americus Institute, was officially founded in 1897. According to an article in the Southern Workman, the school's founders had three goals for the school:

 To provide a thorough high-school education for Negro youth.
 To develop a spirit of self-support in Negro education.
 To stimulate friendly relationship between the races.

Major W. Reddick, a graduate from Atlanta Baptist College's first graduating class, served as the initial principal, with a total faculty of two. The school held its first class on October 2, 1897, with nine students in a small two-room cottage. In its first year of existence, the owners of the school donated roughly $400 for the school's maintenance.

In the years following its establishment, the school grew steadily. The two-room cottage was expanded with additional rooms and a second floor, and a dining hall and dormitories for boys and girls were also built on the campus. By 1907, the faculty had grown to eight, of whom seven had had professional training in education and six had graduated from Spelman Seminary. Additionally, the number of students had increased to 175 students from Southwest Georgia and Florida. That same year, on April 11, one of the dormitories was destroyed in a fire, with Reddick requesting $10,000 in donations to help improve the school. By 1908, the school had 193 students, and in May of that year, noted African American leader Booker T. Washington spoke at the school. By 1909, the school was one of 26 that received financial support from the American Baptist Home Mission Society. The school's annual expenses at this time were about $8,500, while the value of the school's property was about $21,000. In a report from Atlanta Baptist College President George Sale, he spoke highly of the school during this time, stating, "No institution I know of bids so fair to become a great academy for Negro pupils as Americus".

Office of Education report 

In 1917, the school was covered in a report published by the United States Office of Education, which had visited the school in both November 1913 and February 1916. In their report, the office stated that the school "serves as a central institution in which pupils may supplement the training received in the rural schools". Additionally, they noted that the school's "good management is seriously handicapped by lack of funds". The school at this time had 14 teachers and 98 students, though the enrollment for the entire year was 200. As part of the office's conclusions for the school, they recommended that more emphasis be placed on industrial education and that the school needed additional financial support.

Later years 

By 1921, the school, with an enrollment of 229 students, was receiving funding from the General Education Board. Additional funding from this time came from the school's  farm, which generated a net profit of $1,387 in 1922. While the school continued to promote a curriculum of practice over theory, many students from Americus matriculated to some of the best historically black colleges and universities in the country. By 1929, the school became one of five secondary schools to become affiliated with Morehouse College (the new name of Atlanta Baptist College). However, just a few years later, the school permanently closed in 1932.

A historical marker now stands on the former grounds of the school. In February 2020, as part of Black History Month celebrations, the Americus Welcome Center held a tour of the city that highlighted locations of importance to the city's African American history, with Americus Institute being included on the tour.

Notes

References

Sources

External links 
 

1897 establishments in Georgia (U.S. state)
1932 disestablishments in Georgia (U.S. state)
African-American history of Georgia (U.S. state)
Baptist schools in the United States
Christian schools in Georgia (U.S. state)
Defunct Christian schools in the United States
Educational institutions disestablished in 1932
Educational institutions established in 1897
Schools in Sumter County, Georgia